Hans Bethge may refer to:

 Hans Bethge (poet) (1876–1946), German poet and authority on Tang dynasty poetry
 Hans Bethge (aviator) (1890–1918), German World War I flying ace